The 1987–88 Princeton Tigers men's basketball team represented Princeton University in intercollegiate college basketball during the 1987–88 NCAA Division I men's basketball season. The head coach was Pete Carril and the team captain was John Thompson III. The team played its home games in the Jadwin Gymnasium on the University campus in Princeton, New Jersey.  The team finished third in the Ivy League, earning no postseason invitation to either the 1988 NCAA Men's Division I Basketball Tournament or the 1988 National Invitation Tournament. The team posted a 17–9 overall record and a 9–5 conference record.

The team was led by first team All-Ivy League selection Bob Scrabis.  During the season, Bill Bradley was inducted into the College Sports Information Directors of America Academic All-America Hall of Fame.  Using the Princeton offense, the team set the current National Collegiate Athletic Association Division I single-season three-point field goal field goal percentage record (minimum 200 made) with 49.2% shooting (211 of 429).  In addition to leading the nation in three-point field goal percentage, the team led the nation in three-point field goals made per game (8.12).  The subsequent twelve consecutive teams would highlight defense and lead the nation.

That season Princeton established Ivy League standards for career, single-season and single-game three-point field goal shooting.  Dave Orlandini (51.3%) and Tim Neff (51.2%) ended their careers with what continue to be the two highest career three-point field goal percentages in Ivy League history. Orlandini also posted the current single-season record with 54.5% shooting.  In addition, On December 16, 1987, against the Seton Hall Pirates, Orlandini made all five of his three-point attempts, which set the Ivy League single-game record for most made without a miss.  Scrabis matched this record on March 4, 1988, against .  These stood as unsurpassed as the Ivy League record until future Princeton Tigers head coach Sydney Johnson made all six for Princeton on February 28, 1997, but Orlandini's performance continues to be the league record for non-conference games.  In addition, Kit Mueller shot 58.9% on his field goals to earn the first of three Ivy League statistical championships for field goal percentage.

Schedule and results

|-
!colspan=9 style=""| Non-conference regular season

References

Princeton Tigers men's basketball seasons
Princeton Tigers
Princeton
Princeton